Lahonci is a settlement in the hills north of Ormož in northeastern Slovenia. The area belongs to the traditional region of Styria and is now included in the Drava Statistical Region.

There is a small chapel with a belfry in the settlement. It was built in the early 20th century.

References

External links
Lahonci on Geopedia

Populated places in the Municipality of Ormož